The Parliament of Western Australia is the bicameral legislature of the Australian state of Western Australia, forming the legislative branch of the Government of Western Australia. The parliament consists of a lower house, the Legislative Assembly, an upper house, the Legislative Council and the King, represented by the Governor of Western Australia. The two Houses of Parliament sit in Parliament House in the state capital, Perth.

For a bill to become law, it must be passed by both the Legislative Council and the Legislative Assembly, and receive royal assent from the Governor.

The party or coalition commanding the support of a majority of the members of the Legislative Assembly is invited by the governor to form government. The head of government holds the office of Premier of Western Australia.

Currently, the Legislative Council has 36 members elected for four-year terms from multi-member constituencies by proportional representation, and the Legislative Assembly has 59 members, elected for four-year terms from single-member constituencies, using preferential voting.  As with all other Australian states and territories, enrolment to vote and voting for both Houses is compulsory for all resident Australian citizens—and eligible British citizens (i.e., those permanently resident and on the electoral roll prior to the passage of the Australia Act)—who are over the legal voting age of 18.

History
The Western Australian Legislative Council was created in 1832 as an appointed body. In 1870 the then colony was ruled by a governor and an advisory Legislative Council made up of appointed officials and elected members. The Western Australian Legislative Assembly was created in 1890 when the then colony attained self-government. The first premier was John Forrest, who held office until 1901.

On 3 November 2011, the government introduced fixed four-year terms for Parliament, with elections being held every four years on the second Saturday in March. The 2013 state election was the first election under the fixed date system.

See also
 2021 Western Australian state election
 Parliaments of the Australian states and territories

Notes

References

External links

 Parliament website

 
Western Australia